The 1988 Air Force Falcons football team represented the United States Air Force Academy in the 1988 NCAA Division I-A football season as a member of the Western Athletic Conference (WAC). The Falcons were coached by Fisher DeBerry and played their home games at Falcon Stadium.

Schedule

Source:

Personnel

Season summary

BYU

at Hawaii

References

Air Force
Air Force Falcons football seasons
Air Force Falcons football